The Peshawar Museum ((colloquial); پشاور عجائب گھر (official))  is a museum located in Peshawar, capital of Pakistan's Khyber Pakhtunkhwa province. The Peshawar Museum is notable for its collection of Buddhist artwork dating from the ancient Gandhara region.

Background
The Peshawar Museum was founded in 1907 as "Victoria Hall," in memory of Queen Victoria. The two-story building was built in a syncretic architectural style consisting of British, Hindu, Buddhist and Mughal Islamic styles.

The museum initially had only one exhibition hall, but two more were added in 1969–70. In 2004–05, the museum was further expanded with the construction of a new block with two galleries, two halls for the museum's collection in storage, offices for the provincial directorate of archaeology, a conservation laboratory and a cafeteria. The historic exhibition hall was also renovated at that time.

Collection
The current collection has almost 14,000 items based on Gandhara, Greco-Buddhist, Kushan, Parthian, and Indo-Scythian life. Examples include art, sculptures, coins, manuscripts, statues, ancient books, early versions of the Quran, weapons, dresses, jewelry, Kalash effigies, inscriptions, paintings of the Mughal and later periods, household materials and pottery, as well as local and Persian handicrafts.

Gandhara and Greco-Buddhist Art

Peshawar Museum has one of the largest and most extensive collections of Gandhara art of the Buddhist period and is considered to be one of the biggest collections of Buddhist objects in the world. The museum also contains the largest collection on Gautama Buddha. Buddhist stone sculptures, terracotta figurines, and other Buddhist objects. The display of Gandhara art in the main hall includes Buddha's life stories, miracles, worship of symbols, relic caskets, and individual standing Buddha sculptures. The ethnological objects of that period are also exhibited in the museum.

Numismatics

The Peshawar Museum has 8,625 coins, 4,510 of which are pre-Islamic. The main interest of the museum's numismatic collection is that the coins were recovered from archaeological sites, including: Shah-Ji-Ki-Dheri, Shari Bahlol, Takht-i-Bahi and Jamal Garhi. The collections of Bactrian Greek, Indo-Greek, Indo-Scythian, Indo-Parthian and Kushan coins have been published.

Mughal and Persian Islamic Art
This gallery exhibits wooden facades of mosques, ancient Arabic and Persian inscriptions, fine Multani tiles and ceramics, and the dresses and weapons of Syed Ahmad Shaheed Barailvi and numerous ancient leaders. Some of the best works are the Mughal Islamic metal artifacts in bronze and silver, the calligraphic specimens and scrolls that date as far back as 1224.

Middle Age and British Rule to Present
This gallery mainly consists of items displaying the culture and life of the major tribes of the Khyber Pakhtunkhwa province, and the Kalasha Desh located in the far north of the province, where a small tribe of animists called the Kalash live. The museum exhibits cultural items of the Kailash Valley. Exhibits also include swords, daggers, spears, long bows, recurve bows, arrows, shields, muzzle-loading guns, revolvers, pistols and gunpowder boxes

See also
Sethi Mohallah
Governor's House (Peshawar)
 City Museum, Gorkhatri
List of museums in Pakistan

Notes

References

Frontier Archaeology Vol.II, 2004, Catalogue of Coins in the Peshawar Museum No.1 Kushan Period (ed. Ali, I), Directorate of Archaeology & Museums
Frontier Archaeology Vol.IV, 2006, Catalogue of Coins No.2 Indo-Greek and Scytho-Parthian Period (ed. Ali, I), Directorate of Archaeology & Museums

External links
Peshawar Museum – Directorate of Archaeology & Museums KP Pakistan
Gandharan Sculptures in the Peshawar Museum (Life Story of Buddha) by Ihsan Ali and Muhammad Naeem Qazi

1907 establishments in British India
Art museums and galleries in Pakistan
History museums in Pakistan
Museums established in 1907
Museums in Khyber Pakhtunkhwa
Tourist attractions in Peshawar